Sounds of the Season is a Christmas EP by American singer Lionel Richie. Recorded during advent in 2004, it was released by The Island Def Jam Music Group on December 4, 2006 in the United States.

Track listing 
All tracks produced by Chuckii Booker.

Charts

References 

2006 albums
Albums produced by Chuckii Booker
Island Records albums
Lionel Richie albums